The 11th Orgburo of the Russian Communist Party (Bolsheviks) was elected by the 1st Plenary Session of the  11th Central Committee, in the immediate aftermath of the 11th Congress.

Full members

Candidate members

References

Members of the Orgburo of the Central Committee of the Communist Party of the Soviet Union
1922 establishments in Russia
1923 disestablishments in the Soviet Union